Velanai Central College ( Vēlaṇai Mattiya Kallūri) is a provincial school in Velanai, Sri Lanka.

See also
 List of schools in Northern Province, Sri Lanka

References

External links
 Velanai Central College
 Velanai Central College
 Old Students' Association, Canada

Educational institutions established in 1945
Provincial schools in Sri Lanka
Schools in Jaffna District
1945 establishments in Ceylon